Panju Island is an estuarine island in the Vasai Creek just north of Mumbai. The island is used by the Western Railway to connect the island of Salsette with the mainland at Vasai.

See also

 Vasai Creek
 Thane Creek
 Salsette Island
 Mumbai
 Western Suburbs
 Eastern Suburbs

References

Islands of Mumbai
Geography of Thane district
Populated places in India
Islands of India